Shaarei Shamayim (Gates of Heaven) has been the name of two Jewish congregations in Madison, Wisconsin.  The first, dating to the 19th century but no longer in existence, built what is now the eighth-oldest synagogue building still standing in the United States.  The second congregation, dating to 1989, is the sole Reconstructionist congregation in Madison.

The First Shaarei Shamayim
Madison's Shaarei Shamayim congregation was founded in 1856 by Jewish immigrants from Germany.  In 1863, they built a synagogue on the 200 block of West Washington Avenue that was designed by August Kutzbock, a recent German immigrant, in the Rundbogenstil style, a nineteenth-century German form of Romanesque revival.  Kutzbock also used this distinctive style for the Carrie Pierce and Van Slyke Houses in the adjacent Mansion Hill district.  The building now ranks as the eighth-oldest surviving synagogue building in the United States. The Panic of 1873 forced the lease of the building to a Unitarian congregation, and in subsequent years it was repurposed to house the Women's Christian Temperance Union, various churches, a funeral home, and a US government warehouse.

Modern Use of the Building
Gates of Heaven Synagogue was added to the National Register of Historic Places in 1970, and in 1971, thanks to the efforts of local citizens, the building was purchased by the city, restored, and moved to James Madison Park.  Now located at the corner of Gorham and Butler Streets, the Gates of Heaven building is used for concerts, weddings, and other gatherings, as well as serving as a polling location for local and national elections.

Since the early 1980s, Hannah Rosenthal has led High Holiday services at the site, with jazz musician Ben Sidran and vocalist Lynette Margulies providing liturgical music. Sidran's album Life's a Lesson contains selections from these services.

In January 2008, with an average temperature of  outside, The Midwest Beat used the space to record their first full-length record, At the Gates. Later released on Dusty Medical Records, the entire session was recorded by Kyle Motor using an Otari MX-5050 half-inch tape 8 track machine.

Beginning in September 2011, Madison Minyan, an independent partnership minyan began using the synagogue building for monthly Friday night Jewish prayer services. Starting in April 2014, the Minyan added monthly egalitarian services as well, meaning the building is now used for its original purpose at least twice a month.

The Second Shaarei Shamayim

The modern Shaarei Shamayim congregation was formed in 1989 by attendees of Rosenthal's High Holiday services. Since 2008, the modern Shaarei Shamayim congregation has shared the 1952 First Unitarian Society Meeting House designed by Frank Lloyd Wright.

References

External links

Gates of Heaven Synagogue
1944 photograph

German-Jewish culture in the United States
German-American culture in Wisconsin
Synagogues in Wisconsin
Religious buildings and structures in Madison, Wisconsin
Rundbogenstil synagogues
Reconstructionist synagogues in the United States
Tourist attractions in Madison, Wisconsin
National Register of Historic Places in Madison, Wisconsin
Synagogues on the National Register of Historic Places in Wisconsin
Synagogues completed in 1863